Uriel is an archangel in the Judeo-Christian tradition. It may also refer to:

People
 Uriel Adriano (born 1990), Mexican taekwondo practitioner
 Uriel Álvarez (born 1990), Mexican footballer
 Uriel Antuna (born 1997), Mexican footballer
 Uriel Birnbaum (1894–1956), Austrian painter and writer
 Uriel Buso (born 1973), Israeli politician
 Uriel Crocker (1796–1887), publisher in Boston, USA
 Uriel da Costa (c.1585–1640), Portuguese philosopher
 Uriel da Veiga (born 1940), Brazilian footballer
 Uriel Davidi (1922–2006), Iranian rabbi
 Uriel Davis (born 1943), Israeli academic
 Uriel del Toro (born 1978), Mexican actor and model
 Uriel Emil (born 1975), Israeli actor
 Uriel Feige (born 19??), Israeli computer scientist
 Uriel Fernandes (1913–2000), Brazilian footballer
 Uriel Flores Aguayo (born 1959), Mexican politician
 Uriel Frisch (born 1940), French physicist
 Andrés Uriel Gallego (1950–2014), Colombian civil engineer and politician
 Uriel Górka (1435–1498), Bishop of Poznań
 Uriel Holmes (1764–1827), American politician
 Uriel Jones (1934–2009), American musician
 Uriel Jové (born 1999), Argentine footballer
 Uriel López Paredes (born 1959), Mexican politician
 Uriel Lubrani (1926–2018), Israeli diplomat
 Uriel Lynn (born 1935), Israeli politician
 Uriel Macias (born 1994), American footballer
 Uriel Miron (born 1968), Israeli artist
 Uriel Molina (born 1932), Nicaraguan theologian
 Uriel Nespoli (1884–1973), Italian conductor
 Uriel Ofek (1926–1987), Israeli writer
 Uriel Pérez (born 1976), Uruguayan footballer.
 Uriel Ramírez Kloster (born 1999), Argentine footballer
 Uriel Reichman (born 1942), Israeli legal scholar, former politician, and president of the Interdisciplinary Center Herzliya
 Uriel Rothblum (1947–2012), Israeli mathematician
 Uriel Sebree (1848–1922), American Naval officer
 Uriel Sebree Hall (1852–1932), American politician
 Uriel Trocki (born 1996), Uruguayan-Israeli basketball player for Hapoel Holon of the Israeli Basketball Premier League
 Uriel Shelach (1908–1981), Israeli poet
 Uriele Vitolo (1831–?), Italian sculptor
 Uriel von Gemmingen (1468–1514), Archbishop of Mainz
 Uriel Waizel (born 1973), Mexican radio personality
 Uriel Weinreich (1926–67), Polish-American linguist
 Uriel Yitzhaki (born 1949), Israeli diplomat.
 Uriel, name adopted by Unarius leader Ruth Norman

Fictional characters
 Uriel (Supernatural), in the television series Supernatural
 Uriel Septim, various characters in The Elder Scrolls video games

Literature
 "Uriel" (poem), by Ralph Waldo Emerson
 Uriel, a planet in the book A Wrinkle in Time

Music
 Uriel (band), 1960s acid rock band

Places
 County Louth, in medieval times also called Uriel
 Airgíalla, anglicised spelling Uriel, medieval Irish kingdom
 Uriel, collective name for the confederation of tribes in Airgíalla

See also
 Oriel (disambiguation)
 Urial, subspecies group of the wild sheep Ovis orientalis
 Uria, seabirds called guillemots, murres, or turr 
 Uriah (disambiguation)